Yulia Merkulova (born 17 February 1984) is a Russian volleyball player, who was born in Lipetsk. Standing at 202 cm, she plays as a middle blocker. She was part of the Russia women's national volleyball team at the 2006 FIVB Volleyball Women's World Championship in Japan.  At club level, she plays for Dinamo Krasnodar.

Awards

Club
 2012–13 CEV Women's Challenge Cup -   Champion, with Dinamo Krasnodar

See also
 List of tall women

References

External links
Profile on FIVB website

1984 births
Living people
Russian women's volleyball players
Sportspeople from Lipetsk
Volleyball players at the 2008 Summer Olympics
Olympic volleyball players of Russia
Volleyball players at the 2012 Summer Olympics